Ships of Hate is a 1931 American pre-Code drama film directed by John P. McCarthy and starring Lloyd Hughes, Dorothy Sebastian and Charles Middleton.

Synopsis
A fierce rivalry is raged over a dancer by a captain of a ship and one of the men who has been shanghaied to serve aboard it.

Cast
 Lloyd Hughes as Bart Wallace
 Dorothy Sebastian as Grace Walsh
 Charles Middleton as Captain Lash
 Lloyd Whitlock as Norman Walsh
 Ted Adams as The Professor
 Constantine Romanoff as Hans
 Gordon De Main as Ship's First Mate
 Jean Mason as Peg

References

Bibliography
 Dooley, Roger. From Scarface to Scarlett: American Films in the 1930s. Harcourt Brace Jovanovich, 1984.
 Okuda, Ted. The Monogram Checklist: The Films of Monogram Pictures Corporation, 1931-1952. McFarland, 1987.

External links
 

1931 films
1931 drama films
American drama films
Films directed by John P. McCarthy
Monogram Pictures films
Seafaring films
1930s English-language films
1930s American films